Gdynia Obłuże is a no longer operational PKP freight railway station in Gdynia (Pomeranian Voivodeship), Poland.

Lines crossing the station

References 
Gdynia Obłuże article at Polish Stations Database, URL accessed at 17 June 2006

Obluze
Disused railway stations in Pomeranian Voivodeship